Yu Zui (Chinese: 余罪) is a 2016 Chinese web series jointly produced by iQiyi, New Classics Media and Zeus Entertainment. It is based on the crime novel of the same name by Chang Shuxin, and stars Zhang Yishan in the title role. The series premiered on 23 May 2016 via iQiyi and aired for two seasons. The third season of the series is currently in production.

Synopsis 
It tells the story of Yu Zui, a police cadet who enters the society; and the challenges and dangers he face as an undercover cop.

Season One
A group of young students at the Police Academy gets into a fight at a local restaurant and are at risk to be expelled from the profession. Xu Pingqiu, a highly respected figure in the industry, offers them a second chance. If they are able to succeed with his training, they are able to become certified police officers and their past crimes will be erased. However, the training is very atypical. The students a dropped in the middle of an unfamiliar city with nothing other than a cellphone and bracelet, and they have to survive forty days. Through various methods, Yu Zui finds and gathers his team mates. In the midst of chaos, one of the students, Shu Biao disappears. Yu Zui finds and mistakenly kills the person who kidnapped Shu Biao. After he was imprisoned, Yu Zui discovers that he was being deceived. There, he becomes good friends with his fellow inmate, Fu Guosheng, whose actual identity is the leader of a Drug Trafficking ringleader. He becomes an undercover cop to get closer to Fu Guosheng, who later sent him to spy on Zheng Chao. Yu Zui wants to make use of the distrust between Fu Guosheng and Zheng Chao to eliminate the latter, while Zheng Chao wants to get rid of Yu Zui.

Season Two 
Under Yu Zui's instigation, Zheng Chao betrays Fu Guosheng and established his own drug ring; causing him to be estranged from his former boss. Zheng Chao was later caught, and Yu Zui replaces Zheng Chao as the leader of the criminal organization. His rise to position raises Fu Guosheng's suspicion, who sends Si Hai to test him. Yu Zui discovers Fu Guosheng's plan in time, and gradually gains the latter's trust. Lin Jingyu also joins Yu Zui in his undercover mission and together the two of them tries to crack down on Fu Guosheng's crimes. At the end of the season, Fu Guosheng was arrested with the help of an unexpected person and Yu Zui rejoins his team mates at the Police Academy. However, he realizes that An Jialu is at the hands of Fu Guosheng's subordinates. Together, the team sets out to rescue An Jialu.

Cast

Reception 
The drama received positive reception. It attracted more than 100 million views on iQiyi within days of its premiere, making it one of the most popular TV series tailored for the online platform. It also has a score of 8.9/10 on Douban, becoming one of the highest rated dramas. Television producer and critic Xie Xiaohu credits the success of “Yu Zui” to the unique character of its protagonist, who differs from the usual straight-laced, incorruptible police officers; and the show's attention-grabbing and lewd content. The background of the original writer Chang Shuxin, who was jailed decades ago and thus has a good understanding of police officers, also contributed to the success of the show.

Despite the show's success, the series was later taken off the internet. Numerous sources have pointed to China’s media regulation body, the State Administration of Press, Publication, Radio, Film, and Television (SAPPRFT), who banned the show for its explicit content.

Awards and nominations

References

Chinese crime television series
2016 Chinese television series debuts
Television shows based on Chinese novels
IQIYI original programming
Chinese web series
Television series by New Classics Media
2016 web series debuts